Homa Hosseini (born 22 December 1988) is an Iranian rower born in Kermanshah.

She represented Iran in the single sculls event at the 2008 Summer Olympics in Beijing. Hosseini was one of three female Iranian competitors at the Games, and was the first-ever female Iranian Olympic rower. She also was her country's flagbearer at the Games' opening ceremony.

References

Living people
1988 births
Iranian female rowers
Olympic rowers of Iran
Rowers at the 2008 Summer Olympics
People from Kermanshah
Sportspeople from Kermanshah